Herpetopoma bellum is a species of sea snails, marine gastropod mollusc in the family Chilodontidae.

Description
The size of the shell varies between 4 mm and 5.5 mm.
The small, solid, thick shell has a globose-conic shape, evenly grained all over. it is blackish or pink varied with darker. It is imperforate when adult, and has a groove at the place of the umbilicus. The short spire is conic. The apical whorl is smooth, the following whorl has three granose lirae, the next with 3 or 4; the penultimate has 7 or 8 equal, grained lirae. The interstices are narrow. The body whorl has ten such lirae. The teleoconch contains 5 convex whorls. The last one is globose, descending at the aperture. The rounded aperture is nacre with steel-blue and dark red reflections. It is lirate inside. The concave columella terminates in a tooth, below which there is a narrow notch, and another tubercle or tooth on the basal lip equal in size to the columellar denticle.

Distribution 
This marine species occurs off New Zealand., Chatham Island and Tasmania.

References

External links
 

bellum
Gastropods described in 1873